Flemingsburg Junction is an unincorporated community in Fleming County, Kentucky, United States. The Ben Johnson House, which is listed on the National Register of Historic Places, is located in Flemingsburg Junction.

References

Unincorporated communities in Fleming County, Kentucky
Unincorporated communities in Kentucky